Clostridium drakei is a strictly anaerobic bacterium from the genus Clostridium which has been isolated from a coal mine pond in Germany.

References

 

Bacteria described in 2005
drakei